Core is the debut studio album by American rock band Stone Temple Pilots, released on September 29, 1992, through Atlantic Records. The album peaked at No. 3 on the Billboard charts and was certified 8x platinum by the RIAA, making it the band's best-selling album of their career.

Recording
Core was recorded with producer Brendan O'Brien at Rumbo Recorders in Los Angeles over the course of three weeks. The first recorded track for the album, "Wet My Bed", was from an improv session between vocalist Scott Weiland and bassist Robert DeLeo, who were alone in the studio. Producer O'Brien is heard at the end walking in saying "All right, now what?" After recording was done, the band named the album Core, named after the apple featured in the story of Adam and Eve in the Bible.

Composition
Core displayed the band's attempt to revive the album-oriented music approach of the 1970s. Striving to create an intense and emotional sound, Weiland said that the main theme of the album is that humanity is confused, with songs like "Sex Type Thing" and "Naked Sunday" dealing with social injustice. "Sex Type Thing", according to Weiland, deals with abuse of power, "macho" behavior, and humanity's attitude toward women, treating them as sex objects. Weiland stated that "Naked Sunday" "is about organized religion. About people who tell others what to do and what to believe. They switch off people's minds and control the masses. It gives me a feeling of isolation, when I think about it. Organized religion does not view everyone as equals."  Further explaining his lyrical style on Core, Weiland was quoted as saying:

The lyrics of "Wicked Garden" deal with the loss of innocence and purity, while "Sin" addresses "violent and ugly" relationships. The song "No Memory," a musical interlude between "Wicked Garden" and "Sin", was written by guitarist Dean DeLeo.

Reception

Critics, audiences and peers from the alternative scene had split opinions of the band. Music journalists accused the band of stealing their sound from other grunge acts, most notably Pearl Jam. The band also received hostile complaints about their first single, "Sex Type Thing", as many thought the song promoted date rape. Entertainment Weeklys Deborah Frost wrote that "Sex Type Thing" "could be Mike Tyson's rape defense transcribed into grunge rock. It's unclear whether STP, which sounds like it has crash-landed Pearl Jam into Alice in Chains, is condemning or identifying with its narrator. With a real point of view, this band could be bigger than an accident." Paul Evans of Rolling Stone concluded that the "inner child of Stone Temple Pilots is Iron Maiden, and that kid just won't quit howling." Don Kaye of Kerrang! praised the band's "confidence and identity," unusual in debut albums.

The sharp divide between journalists and the band's fans was present in a January 1994 issue of Rolling Stone, in which the magazine's readers and critics labeled the band as Best and Worst New Band respectively. In later years, Weiland showed sorrow about the mixed reactions that Core got, saying, "It was really painful in the beginning because I just assumed that the critics would understand where we were coming from, that these just weren't dumb rock songs."

Legacy
Several of the album's songs remain rock radio staples in the United States.
In October 2011, Core was ranked number ten (preceded by Eric Clapton's acoustic live album Unplugged) on Guitar World magazine's top ten list of guitar albums of 1992. In 2019, Rolling Stone ranked the album at No. 11 on its list of the "50 Greatest Grunge Albums."

On September 29, 2017, a 25th anniversary edition of Core was released. The reissue includes a 25th Anniversary Super Deluxe Edition (4CD/DVD/LP) box set, an exclusive Core 25th Anniversary T-shirt, and Core 25th Anniversary 16″ x 20″ lithograph. The Super Deluxe Edition's 4CDs present a remastered version of the album, previously unreleased demos and b-sides, and parts of three live performances from 1993 (Castaic Lake Natural Amphitheater, Reading Festival, and MTV Unplugged), alongside the remastered album on a single LP and a DVD including a 5.1 surround sound mix and videos for the album's three singles and Wicked Garden.

Track listing
All lyrics written by Scott Weiland, except where noted.

Personnel
Credits adapted from liner notes

Stone Temple Pilots
Scott Weiland (credited as Weiland) – lead vocals
Dean DeLeo – guitar
Robert DeLeo – bass, backing vocals
Eric Kretz – drums

Additional personnel
 Brendan O'Brien – production and mixing
 Steve Stewart – management
 Nick DiDia – engineer
 Dick Kaneshiro – 2nd engineer
 Tom Baker – mastering
 Kevin Design Hosmann – art director
 Katrina Dickson – photography
 Christian Clayton – illustration

Charts

Weekly charts

Year-end charts

Decade-end charts

Singles charts

Certifications

References

1992 debut albums
Albums produced by Brendan O'Brien (record producer)
Atlantic Records albums
Stone Temple Pilots albums